Greenland's climate is a tundra climate (Köppen ET) on and near the coasts and an ice cap climate (Köppen EF) in inland areas. It typically has short, cool summers and long, moderately cold winters.

Due to Gulf Stream influences, Greenland's winter temperatures are very mild for its latitude. In Nuuk, the capital, average winter temperatures are only . This is too low to sustain trees, and the land is treeless tundra.

On the Greenland ice sheet, the temperature is far below freezing throughout the year, and record high temperatures have peaked only slightly above freezing.

In the far south of Greenland, there is a very small forest in the Qinngua Valley, due to summer temperatures being barely high enough to sustain trees.

Climate change 

The ice is so massive that its weight presses the bedrock of Greenland below sea level and is so all-concealing that not until recently did scientists discover Greenland's Grand Canyon or the possibility that Greenland might actually be three islands.

If the ice melted, the interior bedrock below sea level would be covered by water. It is not clear whether this water would be at sea level or a lake above sea level. If it would be at sea level it could connect to the sea at Ilulissat Icefjord, in Baffin Bay and near Nordostrundingen, creating three large islands. But it is most likely that it would be a lake with one drain.

It is thought that before the last Ice Age, Greenland had mountainous edges and a lowland (and probably very dry) center which drained to the sea via one big river flowing out westwards, past where Disko Island is now.

There is concern about sea level rise caused by ice loss (melt and glaciers falling into the sea) on Greenland. Half of the increase was from higher summer melting, with the rest caused by the movements of some glaciers exceeding the speeds needed to balance upstream snow accumulation.

Researchers at NASA's Jet Propulsion Laboratory and the University of Kansas reported in February 2006 that the glaciers are melting twice as fast as they were five years ago. The increased ice loss may be partially offset by increased snow accumulation due to increased precipitation.

Between 1991 and 2006, monitoring of the weather at one location (Swiss Camp) found that the average winter temperature had risen almost .

Recently, Greenland's three largest outlet glaciers have started moving faster, satellite data show. These are the Jakobshavn Isbræ at Ilulissat on the western edge of Greenland, and the Kangerdlugssuaq and Helheim glaciers on the eastern edge of Greenland. The two latter accelerated greatly during the years 2004–2005, but returned to pre-2004 velocities in 2006. The accelerating ice flow has been accompanied by a dramatic increase in seismic activity. In March 2006, researchers at Harvard University and the Lamont–Doherty Earth Observatory at Columbia University reported that the glaciers now generate swarms of earthquakes up to magnitude 5.0.

The retreat of Greenland's ice is revealing islands that were thought to be part of the mainland.

Future projections 
In the Arctic, temperatures are rising faster than anywhere else in the world. Greenland is losing 200 billion tonnes of ice per year. Research suggests that this could increase the sea levels' rise by 30 centimeters by the end of the century. These projections have the possibility of changing as satellite data only dates back to 40 years ago. This means that researchers must view old photographs of glaciers and compare them to ones taken today to determine the future of Greenland's ice.

Climate data

Temperature extremes

Highest temperatures

Lowest temperatures

Towns

See also
 Geography of Greenland
 Greenland Ice Sheet
 Climate change in Greenland

References

Geography of Greenland